Rosenhayn is an unincorporated community and census-designated place (CDP) located within Deerfield Township, in Cumberland County, New Jersey, United States. It is part of the Vineland-Millville- Bridgeton Primary Metropolitan Statistical Area for statistical purposes. As of the 2010 United States Census, the CDP's population was 1,098.

Rosenhayn was founded as a Jewish agricultural colony and the 1898 Rosenhayn synagogue is one of the fewer than 100 surviving nineteenth century synagogue buildings in the United States.

Geography
According to the United States Census Bureau, the CDP had a total area of 2.654 square miles (6.874 km2), all land.

Demographics

Census 2010

Census 2000
As of the 2000 United States Census there were 1,099 people, 373 households, and 286 families residing in the CDP. The population density was 160.1/km2 (414.4/mi2). There were 393 housing units at an average density of 57.3/km2 (148.2/mi2). The racial makeup of the CDP was 70.43% White, 19.29% African American, 0.64% Native American, 0.18% Asian, 6.28% from other races, and 3.18% from two or more races. Hispanic or Latino of any race were 9.92% of the population.

There were 373 households, out of which 35.4% had children under the age of 18 living with them, 52.5% were married couples living together, 17.4% had a female householder with no husband present, and 23.1% were non-families. 17.7% of all households were made up of individuals, and 7.8% had someone living alone who was 65 years of age or older. The average household size was 2.93 and the average family size was 3.29.

In the CDP the population was spread out, with 29.9% under the age of 18, 7.6% from 18 to 24, 27.8% from 25 to 44, 21.6% from 45 to 64, and 13.0% who were 65 years of age or older. The median age was 36 years. For every 100 females, there were 94.2 males. For every 100 females age 18 and over, there were 93.5 males.

The median income for a household in the CDP was $38,702, and the median income for a family was $38,155. Males had a median income of $33,092 versus $22,216 for females. The per capita income for the CDP was $14,801. About 12.2% of families and 15.7% of the population were below the poverty line, including 12.1% of those under age 18 and 25.2% of those age 65 or over.

Notable people

People who were born in, residents of, or otherwise closely associated with Rosenhayn include:
 Joseph W. Chinnici (1919-2007), politician who served in the New Jersey General Assembly from the 1st legislative district from 1972 to 1988.
 Frank LoBiondo (born 1946), politician who served as the U.S. representative for New Jersey's 2nd congressional district from 1995 to 2019.
 Al McCoy (1894-1966), boxing world middleweight champion from 1914 to 1917.

References

Census-designated places in Cumberland County, New Jersey
Deerfield Township, New Jersey